First Sentier Investors, formerly known as Colonial First State Global Asset Management in Australia and First State Investments elsewhere, is a global asset management business that manages US$146.2 billion (as at 31 December 2022) in assets managed on behalf of institutional investors, pension funds, wholesale distributors, investment platforms, financial advisers and clients worldwide. First Sentier Investors provides active, specialist investment capabilities managed by a group of independent investment teams. They take a long-term approach to investment with a focus on preserving capital and performance through market cycles.

In August 2019, Mitsubishi UFJ Trust and Banking Corporation acquired the business from the Commonwealth Bank. The company operates as a standalone global investment management business, with offices across Asia, Australasia, Europe and North America.

History

In October 2018, Mark Steinberg became CEO. From 2000 until 2019, Colonial First State Global Asset Management was part of the Commonwealth Bank's Wealth Management Division. On 2 August 2019, Mitsubishi UFJ Trust and Banking Corporation acquired the business. First Sentier retained its sub-brands Realindex Investments, FSSA Investment Managers, and Stewart Investors. In June 2019, women held 22% of the investment roles at the company, and 27% of senior leadership roles. In late 2019, the company rebranded from Colonial First State Global Asset Management to First Sentier Investors in Australia, while continuing to use the First State Investments brand globally. In September 2019 CFSGAM officially launched the rebrand to First Sentier Investors (FSI), with $222.7 billion in assets under management as of 30 June 2019. In September 2020, First State Investments also rebranded to First Sentier Investors, with the company for the first time using the same brand name both in Australia and globally. 

First Sentier invested in an infrastructure fund operated by Korea Investment & Securities in Seoul in September 2020, with the local investment firm Kiwoom Asset Management an underlying manager. In October 2020, it bought states in several electrical plants in the United Kingdom. In November 2020, the company was the second largest asset manager in Australia behind Macquarie Group. It had operations in nine countries, with 17 investment teams, including an office in New York. In December 2021, First Sentier Investors purchased two Queensland solar farms, including the Gretel solar portfolio. They were added to Atmos Renewables, an investment company that First Sentier owned through its Global Diversified Infrastructure Fund. By the beginning of 2022, Atmos had also acquired several other First Sentier acquisitions, including wind farms in Australia in October 2020, for A$285 million from John Laing Group. Sentier owned the French heating operator Coriance in late 2022 and was considering selling it for as much as $1.5 billion, according to Bloomberg. At the start of 2023, First Sentier Investors was managing $134 billion in assets.

Corporate structure
The company is based in Sydney, Australia.

First Sentier Investors operates as a standalone business governed by a Board of Directors.

It has assets under management of US$134 billion as of 2023.

First Sentier Investors includes full ownership of FSSA Investment Managers, Stewart Investors, Realindex Investments, and Igneo Infrastructure Partners.

Responsible investment
First Sentier Investors has been a signatory to the United Nations' Principles for Responsible Investment since 2007 and produces an annual report.

References

External links

Commonwealth Bank
Financial services companies based in Sydney
Mitsubishi UFJ Financial Group
1988 establishments in Australia

2019 mergers and acquisitions